Joseph Sunnen (June 16, 1897–April 1979) was an American machinery manufacturer, and founder of the Sunnen Foundation.

Biography
Sunnen was born in the coal mining town of Thayer, Illinois.  He left school in the 7th grade to help on the family farm.  At age 17, he purchased a Missouri lead mine with family savings, however, this failed and his brother Gus offered him employment in his automobile garage in Mexico, Missouri.

In 1923, at age 21, Sunnen applied for his first of nearly 100 patents, a valve lifter tool, marking the beginnings of Sunnen Company.  However that same year he was nearly killed in a work explosion which burnt most of his body, and spent a year recovering.  He returned to his brother's garage for employment and while in Mexico, Missouri, met and married Miss Cornelia Miller.  They moved to St. Louis to pursue Sunnen's manufacturing ambitions in 1924.  There Sunnen converted a 1916 Hupmobile into a camper and set out on the road to sell 500 of his new valve lifter tools.  They sold two or three tools a day until they reached Mankato, Minnesota where a large distributor of shop tools bought his remaining stock and placed an order for 1,000 additional tools.  Following the trip, Sunnen returned home to build his manufacturing business around the auto engine rebuilding trade.  The Sunnen Company grew to become a renowned global manufacturer of precision honing devices, and holds a position of global prominence to this day.

In 1946, Joseph Sunnen made a generous donation to the Ozarks YMCA, and subsequently formed the Sunnen Foundation for further charitable projects.  Sunnen's children and grandchildren continue to use the Sunnen Foundation as a vehicle for charity, with a particular emphasis on First Amendment rights, reproductive rights, and youth services.

References
 Junior Achievement: St. Louis: Joseph Sunnen
 Manufacturing Centre: Last Cut: On the Road with the Founder: Joe Sunnen
 YMCA of the Ozarks: History: YMCA of Greater St. Louis Camping History
 St. Louis Business Journal: Sunnen Foundation transformed YMCA of the Ozarks June 26, 1998, by Allyson Mccollum

American manufacturing businesspeople
1897 births
1979 deaths
20th-century American businesspeople
People from Sangamon County, Illinois
People from Mexico, Missouri
20th-century American inventors